Theophan the Recluse, also known as Theophan Zatvornik or Theophanes the Recluse (Russian: Святитель Феофан Затворник Вышенский, епископ Тамбовский; January 10, 1815 – January 6, 1894), is a well-known saint in the Russian Orthodox Church.

Early life
Theophan the Recluse, also known as Theophan Zatvornik or Theophanes the Recluse or (in the Library of Congress Name Authority File, and therefore in many library catalogs) as "Ḟeofan, Saint, Bishop of Tambov and Shatsk, 1815–1894", was born on January 10, 1815, as Georgy Vasilievich Govorov, in the village of Chernavsk, in the Oryol Governorate of the Russian Empire. His father was a Russian Orthodox priest. He was educated in the seminaries at Livny, Oryol and Kyiv.

Career
In 1841 he was ordained, became a monk, and adopted the name Theophan. He later became the Bishop of Tambov.

He is especially well-known today through the many books he wrote concerning the spiritual life, especially on the subjects of the Christian life and the training of youth in the faith. He also played an important role in translating the Philokalia from Church Slavonic into Russian. The Philokalia is a classic of Orthodox spirituality, composed of the collected works of a number of Church Fathers which were edited and placed in a four volume set in the 17th and 18th centuries. A persistent theme is developing an interior life of continuous prayer, learning to "pray without ceasing" as St. Paul teaches in his first letter to the Thessalonians.

Death
Theophan the Recluse died on January 6, 1894, and lay in state for three days in his church. Even after that length of time there was no sign of decay in his unembalmed body. He was buried in the Kazan church of the Vysha Monastery.

The Spiritual Life and How to Be Attuned To It
The Spiritual Life and How to Be Attuned To It was originally written in response to Theophan's encounter with a young woman. While at a ball, this upper class Moscow woman began having irrational thoughts about the meaning of life and the immortality of man. After contacting Theophan, the two began corresponding through letters, the lady writing on her spiritual difficulties and Theophan responding with spiritual advice. This correspondence had a significant impact on the woman; she later became a nun. The Saint Herman Press, the publisher of the illustrated edition of The Spiritual Life and How to Be Attuned to It, notes that it was of great importance to Theophan that the young woman should "be able to keenly hear the right 'tone' of spiritual life".

Veneration as a saint
Theophan was canonized by the Local Council of the Russian Orthodox Church of 1988.  The act of canonization declared that his "deep theological understanding of the Christian teaching, as well as its performance in practice, and, as a consequence of this, the loftiness and holiness of the life of the sviatitel''' allow for his writings to be regarded as a development of the teaching of the Holy Fathers, preserving the same Orthodox purity and Divine enlightenment." His feast day is celebrated January 6 or January 10.

Quotes
 "He who believes in God, but does not confess Him as the Father of the Son, does not believe in a god that is the true God, but in some personal invention."
"You ask, will the heterodox be saved... Why do you worry about them? They have a Saviour Who desires the salvation of every human being. He will take care of them. You and I should not be burdened with such a concern. Study yourself and your own sins... I will tell you one thing, however: should you, being Orthodox and possessing the Truth in its fullness, betray Orthodoxy, and enter a different faith, you will lose your soul forever."
"Where there is no prayer and fasting there are the demons."

Books in English translation
 }.
 
 Turning the Heart to God (Partial translation of The Path to Salvation'')
 }.
 
 }
 
 }. This book consists of excerpts from his "The Path of Salvation"

See also

 Hermit
 Hesychasm
 Poustinia
 Theophanes the Confessor, a Byzantine saint

References

External links
St Theophan the Recluse: The Bishop of Tambov biography (Orthodox Church in America website)
What is Prayer? by Theophan the Recluse (Youtube playlist of 5 videos containing the complete English translation of this work.)
Writings of St. Theophan the Recluse at theophan.net
English translation of a letter of Theophan the Recluse to the husband of his sister of 12th of February 1874
 The Act of Canonization of the Local Council of the Russian Orthodox Church, Trinity-Sergius Laura, 6–9 June, 1988.

Theophanes the Recluse
Theophanes the Recluse
People from Izmalkovsky District
People from Yeletsky Uyezd
19th-century Eastern Orthodox bishops
Russian saints of the Eastern Orthodox Church
Russian theologians
Hesychasts
19th-century Christian saints
19th-century Eastern Orthodox theologians
Translators of the Philokalia